Rahila Gul Magsi is a Pakistani politician who is currently a member of Senate of Pakistan representing Pakistan Muslim League (N).

Political career
She had been Nazim of Tando Allahyar District from 2005 to 2010.

In March 2013, she joined Pakistan Muslim League (N) (PML-N).

She was elected to the Senate of Pakistan as a candidate of PML-N in 2015 Pakistani Senate election.

In 2017, the Anti-Corruption Establishment launched an inquiry against Magsi after she was found involved in embezzlement of public funds during her tenure as nazim of Tando Allahyar district. In 2018, the National Accountability Bureau (NAB) approved inquiry against her.

References

Living people
Pakistani senators (14th Parliament)
Pakistan Muslim League (N) politicians
Mayors of places in Pakistan
Year of birth missing (living people)